Murat Tosun (born 26 February 1984 in Berlin, Germany) is a Turkish footballer who currently plays as a right winger and striker for Manisaspor.

Honours

Trabzonspor 
 Turkish Cup: 2010
 Turkish Super Cup: 2010

External links 
 Murat Tosun at the Turkish Football Federation

1984 births
Living people
Footballers from Berlin
Turkish footballers
Süper Lig players
Tennis Borussia Berlin players
Karşıyaka S.K. footballers
Ankaraspor footballers
Trabzonspor footballers
Konyaspor footballers
Manisaspor footballers
Association football midfielders
Association football forwards